Stephanie Marie Zúniga- Herrera (born 30 September 1996) is a US-born Salvadoran footballer who plays as a midfielder for Brazilian club Cruzeiro EC and the El Salvador women's national team.

Early life
Zúñiga was born in San Francisco, California and raised in Pinole, California.

High school and college career
Zúniga has attended Bishop O’Dowd High School in Oakland, California and the University of Colorado in Boulder, Colorado.

Club career
On 23 January 2021, Zúñiga signed with Cruzeiro EC in Brazil.

International career
Zúñiga made her senior debut for El Salvador on 8 April 2021.

See also
List of El Salvador women's international footballers

References

1996 births
Living people
Citizens of El Salvador through descent
Salvadoran women's footballers
Women's association football midfielders
Cruzeiro Esporte Clube players
El Salvador women's international footballers
Salvadoran expatriate footballers
Salvadoran expatriates in Brazil
Expatriate women's footballers in Brazil
Soccer players from San Francisco
People from Pinole, California
Sportspeople from the San Francisco Bay Area
American women's soccer players
Colorado Buffaloes women's soccer players
American sportspeople of Salvadoran descent
American expatriate women's soccer players
American expatriate sportspeople in Brazil